A geospatial content management system (GeoCMS) is a content management system where objects (users, images, articles, blogs..) can have a latitude, longitude position to be displayed on an online interactive map. In addition the online maps link to informational pages (wiki pages essentially) on the data represented. Some GeoCMS do also allow users to edit spatial data (points, lines, polygons on maps) as part of content objects. Spatial data can be published by GeoCMS as part of their contents or using standardized interfaces such as WMS or WFS.

A GeoCMS can have a map of registered users allowing to build communities geographically, by looking at users location. The help of wiki for describing geographical layers present a way to solve the problem of geographical metadata.

Since the advent of Google Maps and the publication of its API, numerous users have used online maps to illustrate their web pages. Google Maps is in itself not a GeoCMS but a building block for GeoCMS applications. Similarly Mapserver can also be used for creating GeoCMS.

GeoCMS comparison

References

Content management systems
Geographic data and information